Battle of Seattle is a colloquial name for the 1999 Seattle WTO protests, a period of civil unrest in Seattle, Washington, around a World Trade Organization conference.

Battle of Seattle may also refer to:

 30 Frames a Second: The WTO in Seattle 2000, 2000 documentary film using footage from the 1999 protests
 Battle in Seattle, 2007 action-thriller film loosely based on the 1999 protests
 Battle of Seattle (1856), a Native American effort to expel non-natives from Seattle in 1856